Emil Zubin (born 18 September 1977) was a Slovenian professional footballer who plays for FC Primorje since July 31st 2017. He is a centre-forward and is right footed.

References

External links

 

1977 births
Living people
Slovenian footballers
Association football forwards
FC Koper players
Slovenian expatriate footballers
Slovenian expatriate sportspeople in Italy
Expatriate footballers in Italy
A.S.D. La Biellese players
A.S. Pro Gorizia players